Le Monnier or Lemonnier may refer to:

People
André Lemonnier (1896–1963), French admiral who pioneered French underwater research with Jacques Cousteau
Anicet Charles Gabriel Lemonnier (1743–1824), French painter of historical subjects
Camille Lemonnier (1844–1913), Belgian journalist and poet
Charles Lemonnier (also known as Maurice Lemonnier, 1860–1930), Belgian liberal politician and mayor of Brussels
Eduardo Le Monnier (1873–1931), French-Argentine architect who worked in the Buenos Aires Central Business District
Élisa Lemonnier (1805–1865), French educationist who is considered to be the founder of vocational education for women in France
Émile Lemonnier (1893–1945), French general
Francis Lemonnier (1940–1998), French actor and director of the Parisian Théâtre des Variétés
Hervé Lemonnier (born 1947), French rallycross, rally and ice racing driver of the Andros Trophy series
Jérôme Lemonnier, French film composer, known from The Page Turner
Louis-Guillaume Le Monnier (1717–1799), French natural scientist, brother of Pierre Charles
Meg Lemonnier (1905–1988), British-born French singer and film actress
Pierre Charles Le Monnier (1715–1799), French astronomer, brother of Louise Guillaume
Pierre-René Lemonnier (1731–1796), French playwright
Pierre Lemonnier (physicist) (1675–1757), French astronomer, father of Pierre Charles and Louis Guillaume
Thomas-Paul-Henri Lemonnier (died 1927), 1906-1927 bishop of Bayeux-Lisieux

Other
 Camp Lemonnier, United States Naval Expeditionary Base in Djibouti, named after Emile-René Lemonnier.
 Lemonnier premetro station, an underground tram station in Brussels, Belgium
 Le Monnier (crater), lunar crater named after Pierre Charles Le Monnier
 Le Monnier (publishing house), an Italian publishing house, founded in 1837 and bought in 1999 by Mondadori